This is a list of fellows of the Royal Society elected in 1699.

Fellows 
Robert Shirley  (1673–1699)
John Lowther 1st Viscount Lonsdale (1655–1700)
Reeve Williams  (1682–1703)
Charles Sackville 6th Earl of Dorset (1638–1706)
William Cowper  (1666–1709)
James Cunningham  (1667–1709)
David Krieg  (1669–1710)
Thomas Browne  (1673–1710)
Pierre Silvestre  (1662–1718)
James Pound  (1669–1724)
Martin Bowes  (1671–1726)
Johann Burchard Menkenius  (1675–1732)
Edward Worth  (1678–1733)
George Andre Agricola  (1672–1738)
Paul Buissiere  (1655–1739)

References

1699
1699 in science
1699 in England